HMS Apollo was an  of the Royal Navy, the eighth RN ship to carry the name. She served with the Home Fleet during World War II, taking part in the Normandy Landings before being transferred to the British Pacific Fleet. Put into reserve in 1946, she was recommissioned in 1951, serving until 1961, and was sold for scrapping in 1962.

Service history

1944
Commissioned after sea trials in February 1944 Apollo joined the Home Fleet at Scapa Flow before setting out for Plymouth for minelaying operations in support of the planned invasion of France. Loading mines at Milford Haven she commenced a series of operations off the French coast of Brittany between Ushant and Île Vierge.

She was detached for duty in "Operation Neptune" and on 7 June (D-Day+1) she embarked Allied Supreme Commander General Dwight D. Eisenhower, Naval Commander in Chief Admiral Bertram Ramsay, General Bernard Law Montgomery and staff officers from SHAEF, to visit the assault areas. Unfortunately the minelayer grounded while underway, damaging her propellers, and her passengers were transferred to the destroyer .

Apollo took passage to Sheerness and then to the Tyne for repairs, which were completed in September. The ship was then transferred to Western Approaches Command, and deployed in the South-Western Approaches laying deep trap minefields as a countermeasure to U-boat activities in inshore waters. With minelayer  she laid more than 1200 Mk XVII moored mines across the coastal convoy route along the north coast of Cornwall. She started on 29 November 1944 with minefield "HW A1" – this minefield was later fatal to the submarine . On 3 December she laid minefield "HW A3" east of "HW A1". This minefield was later fatal to the submarine .

1945
 
On 15 January 1945 she returned to the Western Approaches for minelaying in the Irish Sea.

After the end of the war in Europe Apollo sailed to Oslo in company with sister ship  and heavy cruiser , returning the Norwegian Government-in-Exile and Crown Prince Olav.

On her return Apollo prepared for service with the British Pacific Fleet, departing from Portsmouth at the end of June. After exercises with the Mediterranean Fleet at Malta in July, she finally arrived at Melbourne on 1 August, by which time her services were no longer required, as the Japanese surrendered on the 15th.

Post-war
Apollo was then employed in repatriation work carrying former British prisoners of war to Shanghai for passage back to the UK. She also carried mail and stores to ships and establishments in the Pacific, including the British Fleet Base at Manus, Shanghai, various Japanese ports and Hong Kong. In mid-1946 Apollo returned to Chatham and was paid off into Reserve.

In 1948 her pennant number was changed from M01 to N01.

1951–1961
Apollo was recommissioned in 1951 after the outbreak of the Korean War, joining the 2nd Cruiser Squadron of the Home Fleet. After Hurricane Charlie struck Jamaica on 17 August 1951, Apollo made a high speed run to deliver relief supplies to the island. In 1953 she took part in the Fleet Review to celebrate the Coronation of Queen Elizabeth II, while in November 1954 she became the Flagship of the Commander-in-Chief, Home Fleet. On 25 August 1960, the destroyer  was carrying out steam trials while moored alongside Apollo at Portsmouth, when steam was let into Battleaxes turbines, driving the ship forward and breaking Apollos mooring lines. Apollo then collided with the frigate , which also broke free  from her moorings and struck the caisson at the entrance to a dock. Apollos stem was damaged, while Wakeful suffered buckled plates from the impact by Apollo and a badly damaged bow from the collision with the caisson.

She was paid off and returned to the Reserve in 1961, was put on the Disposal List the next year, and sold for breaking-up by Hughes Bolckow at Blyth, Northumberland, where she arrived in November 1962.

Commanding officers

References

Publications

 

 

Abdiel-class minelayers
Ships built on the River Tyne
1943 ships
World War II minelayers of the United Kingdom